Iranians in Germany include immigrants from Iran to Germany as well as their descendants of Iranian heritage or background. 
Iranians in Germany are referred to by hyphenated terms such as Iranian-Germans or Persian-Germans. Similar terms Iranisch Deutsch and Persisches Deutsch,  may be found in Germanophone media. In 2021, Federal Statistical Office of Germany (Destatis) estimates that 272,000 people of Iranian background live in Germany.

Multiple Nationality
Nowadays, most Iranian-Germans have German and Iranian citizenship (multiple nationality). Iran almost never frees its citizens from their Iranian citizenship (see Article 989 Iran. Civil Code ), which is inherited through the father (or descent). The still existing German-Iranian agreement of 1929  regulates in no. II of the Final Protocol that government approval is required prior to the naturalization of nationals of the other State.

Notable Iranians in Germany

See also
Asians in Germany
Iran-Germany relations
Iranian diaspora

References

Further reading
 

Ethnic groups in Germany
 
Germany
Middle Eastern diaspora in Germany
Islam in Germany
Muslim communities in Europe